Jeremy Paul (born 14 March 1977) is a New Zealand-born Australia rugby union player. He played hooker for the Wallabies and the ACT Brumbies.

At the end of 2005, Paul was awarded the John Eales Medal, receiving 194 votes from his teammates. He ruptured a tendon during the Wallabies 24-16 Tri-Nations' loss to South Africa in September 2006 and underwent surgery, and was forced to miss the European tour.

He has won 72 caps for Australia and 112 Super Rugby caps for the ACT Brumbies.

In May 2007 Paul signed with Gloucester Rugby for the start of the 2007/08 season but, for contractual reasons, he was not able to join the squad until after the 2007 Rugby World Cup. He made his Gloucester Rugby debut on 27 October 2007 in the Anglo-Welsh EDF Energy Cup against Newcastle Falcons.

References

External links

1977 births
Living people
Australian expatriate sportspeople in England
Australian rugby union players
Australia international rugby union players
Rugby union hookers
Gloucester Rugby players
Rugby union players from Hamilton, New Zealand
ACT Brumbies players
New Zealand Māori rugby union players